Guernsey is an unincorporated community in Guernsey County, in the U.S. state of Ohio.

History
A post office called Wheeling was established in 1874, and the name was changed to Guernsey in 1881. The community's present name is derived from its location within Guernsey County.

References

Unincorporated communities in Guernsey County, Ohio
Unincorporated communities in Ohio